South Purdown, Bristol, is an ancient green space located in north Bristol, England. The area of land is bordered by central Muller Road, Sir Johns Lane Allotment site, Stoke Park, Lockleaze Open Space and the Priory Hospital, and has been designated a Site of Nature Conservation Interest and an important wildlife corridor.

Known for its natural unmodified meadows alongside outstanding views across the west of Bristol City, the area is traversed by a number of public footpaths, used heavily by local running groups and dog walkers, and is regularly used for local wildlife events, including Bat Walks due to its strong and abundant hedgerows. Numerous neighbourhood events take place at South Purdown, involving local community groups, individuals and schools.

History 
South Purdown was originally part of the Heath House estate, dating back to 1425. Used mainly for agriculture until the 1930s, the Cottrell Dormer family came under financial strain and was forced to sell the land to Bristol Corporation (now Bristol City Council) in 1938 for use as public open space.

Local interest 
Friends of South Purdown group was formed in 2006 to help protect the area from damaging development. In 2015, local residents registered the playing fields, as an asset of Community Value.
Friends of South Purdown was officially disbanded in 2015.

The South Lockleaze & Purdown Neighbourhood Group was set up in 2015 to provide a community voice to the residents within the South Purdown area, following on from the disbandment of the Friends of South Purdown group. The South Lockleaze & Purdown Neighbourhood Group became a C.I.C. officially in January 2016, and has proceeded to run activities and events on South Purdown, including a new outdoor education programme, funded by the Horfield & Lockleaze Neighbourhood Partnership, to improve wildlife and outdoor education offerings within the area.

The South Lockleaze & Purdown Neighbourhood Group is also in the process of arranging a Community Asset Transfer of the closed Eastville Library, which backs onto South Purdown, to provide a community facility and support for the area of South Purdown.

Threats 
Over the years there have been a number of threats to this park land, since it was purchased by Bristol City Council. The leading threat of development has come from Bristol City Council, who aim to develop the natural space into fenced and levelled private sports facilities for Fairfield High School, at a cost of £715,000. An ongoing battle of many local conservation groups, councillors and local residents has taken place, aiming to keep the natural green space accessible for all. This has been effected strongly by the grouping of multiple developments into one planning permission, so that although planning was granted in 2003, over 3 years ago (with no development taken place, planning permission should expire within this timeframe), planning permission is still held indefinitely due to the completion of a different site on Boiling Wells across the main A road, Muller Road.

References 

Parks and open spaces in Bristol